Folkearth is an international music project created in 2003 by musicians playing folk and viking metal. The name (folk + earth) symbolizes musicians from all over the world playing folk music. So far, a total of twelve full-length albums have been released, with the most recent being Balder's Lament.

History 
The history of the group began in February 2003 when the idea for creating a project which could unite musicians from different countries who play folk and pagan metal originated from some musicians. A Nordic Poem album was released in 2004. 
Because of what the band perceived as the poor quality of this record, Folkearth decided to remaster and reissue their debut. On 1 August, 2006, shortly after the reissue of A Nordic Poem the second album titled By the Sword of My Father was released. Many bands, such as Van Langen, Thiasos Dionysos, Hildr Valkyrie, Death Army, The Soil Bleeds Black joined Folkearth in the production of this album, so the total line-up consisted of 31 musicians from 8 different countries. Folkearth's album Drakkars in the Mist was released on 28 May, 2007. with the biggest lineup then to date. More than 30 musicians worked on the fourth album. However, a token performance on a single track will list someone on the booklet as a full-fledged member. The band members also do not make money out of the project, and do not promote it, probably because of the lack of funds.

Because of the musical project's complex structure, Folkearth has not performed live, and it is unlikely they will perform live in the future.

On 30 June 2013, the founder and leader of the band Ruslanas Danisevskis (Metfolvik) died after battling cancer.

Style 
Because of the structure of Folkearth, the recording is also different from that of most bands. Each song begins from an individual or band that is involved in Folkearth and later the other members add their touch to it. Sometimes the work on a single song is based on a single riff or melody; other times some artist writes a song entirely on his own and other musicians simply orchestrate minor details on it. The band members also do not work all together, but rather in small groups, exchanging material they record with others. The music Folkearth makes is regular folk/Viking metal, while they incorporate a diverse selection of folk instruments, such as lute, nyckelharpa, shawm, saz and many others. The extent that traditional instruments and elements are used varies greatly between songs.

Lyrics 
The lyrics are all written in English with the exception of "Gryningssång". The main topic of Folkearth's lyrics are ancient history,  beliefs, and mythology, especially Norse mythology. Celtic mythology and  Greek mythology are also present in Folkearth's lyrics. Folkearth's songs tell stories and their purpose is to entertain, not to carry a symbolic or personal message.

Band members

Discography 
 A Nordic Poem (2004)
 By the Sword of My Father (2006)
 Drakkars in the Mist (2007)
 Father of Victory (2008)
 Songs of Yore (2008)
 Fatherland (2008)
 Rulers of the Sea (2009)
 Viking's Anthem (2010)
 Sons of the North (2011)
 Minstrels by the River (2011)
 Valhalla Ascendant (2012)
 Balder's Lament (2014)

See also
 Folkodia

References

External links 
 Folkearth homepage
 Folkearth Youtube channel

Folk metal musical groups
Musical groups established in 2003
Viking metal musical groups